James Franklin Bethune-Baker   (23 August 1861 – 13 January 1951) was the Lady Margaret's Professor of Divinity at the University of Cambridge from 1891 to 1935.

A Modern Churchman, Bethune-Baker was known for his work on the person and writings of Nestorius. He was co-editor of the Journal of Theological Studies from 1904 to 1935. He was a Fellow of Pembroke College, Cambridge for sixty years. His funeral service took place in Pembroke College Chapel on 17 January 1951, but he was buried in the Ascension Parish Burial Ground, Cambridge. He was a cousin of Arthur Christopher Benson, who is also buried in the Ascension Parish Burial Ground.

He was married to Edith Bethune-Baker,  Furneaux Jordan, a welfare campaigner, who was born in 1862. Their son Arthur Bethune-Baker was a contemporary of Charles Hamilton Sorley at Marlborough College, but he died while still at school, aged sixteen.

Selected works
 Influence of Christianity on War, 1888
 The Meaning of Homoousios in the "Constantinopolitan" Creed, 1901.
 An Introduction to the Early History of Christian Doctrine, to the Time of the Council of Chalcedon, 1903 (revised 1933)
 
 The Faith of the Apostles' Creed: An Essay in Adjustment Of Belief and Faith, 1918.

External links

 
 

1861 births
1951 deaths
Fellows of the British Academy
Fellows of Pembroke College, Cambridge
Lady Margaret's Professors of Divinity